Robert Savković (born 27 September 1978) is a retired Croatian handball player. He last played for RK Crikvenica and he also played for Croatian national team U-21.

Career
Savković started his career in hometown club RK Zamet. In his first season with the club he helped them return to the top flight by winning the First B League. He also won the Croatian U-18 Championship with a very talented generation that featured Nikola Blažičko, Mirza Džomba, Renato Sulić and Milan Uzelac. In 1998 Savković debuted in his first European competition, in the EHF Cup.

In 1999 Savković joined Austrian SG West Wien. He stayed with the club for only one season. In 2000 he transfer'd to RK Badel 1862 Zagreb.

Honours
RK Zamet
Croatian Championship U-18 (1): 1996
Croatian First B League (1): 1995-1996

RK Zagreb
Croatian First A League (1): 2000-01

External links
European stats
European stats

References

1978 births
Living people
Croatian male handball players
Handball players from Rijeka
RK Crikvenica players
RK Zamet players
RK Zagreb players
Croatian expatriate sportspeople in Austria
Croatian expatriate sportspeople in Sweden
Croatian expatriate sportspeople in Denmark
Croatian expatriate sportspeople in France
Croatian expatriate sportspeople in Spain
Croatian expatriate sportspeople in Italy
Liga ASOBAL players